The 1945 Utah State Aggies football team was an American football team that represented Utah State Agricultural College in the Mountain States Conference (MSC) during the 1945 college football season. In their 26th season under head coach Dick Romney, the Aggies compiled a 4–3 record (1–3 against MSC opponents) and finished fourth in the MSC. The team outscored opponents by a total of 173 to 92, largely on the strength of two shutout victories (45–0 and 52–0) against the Idaho Marines from Pocatello.

End John Putnik was named to the 1945 all-conference football team selected by the International News Service. He was also invited to play in the East-West Shrine Game. Back Jack Seiferling was drafted by the Pittsburgh Steelers in the fifth round of the 1946 NFL Draft.

Schedule

References

Utah State
Utah State Aggies football seasons
Utah State Aggies football